Cadenza Innovation Inc. is an American developer and designer of lithium-ion battery technologies and energy storage solutions. The company was founded in 2012 by inorganic chemist and battery researcher Christina Lampe-Önnerud. Cadenza licenses its lithium ion cell architecture to global manufacturers for various energy storage applications.

History 
Lampe-Önnerud founded Cadenza Innovation while working as a member of the senior management for the hedge fund Bridgewater Associates. The company operates a facility in Wilton, Connecticut and has a research unit at the Duracell headquarters in Bethel, Connecticut. The corporate headquarters is located in Danbury, Connecticut inside The Summit at Danbury office complex.

In 2021, Cadenza announced a partnership with Rockwell Automation to establish high performance battery cell production lines.

Technology 
Cadenza Innovation's supercell battery architecture is designed to stop propagation during thermal runaway. The design of the batteries combines properties from wound jelly rolls and large prismatic cells to form highly dense lithium-ion battery structures.

References

External links
Official website

Engineering companies of the United States
Electronics companies established in 2012
Battery manufacturers
Companies based in Fairfield County, Connecticut
Companies based in Danbury, Connecticut